The Riggs National Bank, Washington Loan And Trust Company Branch, also known as Washington Loan and Trust, is a historic building in Washington, D.C. It currently serves as a hotel.

History
It was built in 1891.  It was a work of James G. Hill and Arthur B. Heaton.  It was listed on the National Register of Historic Places in 1971 for its architecture, which is Romanesque Revival and Richardsonian Romanesque.

The building was converted to the Courtyard Washington Convention Center Hotel in 1999. The hotel closed in 2018 for a major renovation and reopened in 2019 as Riggs Washington DC Hotel. The Riggs Washington DC was then inducted into Historic Hotels of America, an official program of the National Trust for Historic Preservation, that same year.

See also
Riggs National Bank, also NRHP-listed in Washington, D.C.

References

External links
Riggs Washington DC Hotel official website

Bank buildings on the National Register of Historic Places in Washington, D.C.
Richardsonian Romanesque architecture in Washington, D.C.
Commercial buildings completed in 1891
Hotel buildings completed in 1891
Hotels established in 1999
Hotels established in 2019
1999 establishments in Washington, D.C.
Riggs family
Historic Hotels of America